Two Señoritas from Chicago is a 1943 American musical comedy film directed by Frank Woodruff and starring Joan Davis, Jinx Falkenburg and Ann Savage.

The film's sets were designed by the art director Lionel Banks.

Cast
 Joan Davis as Daisy Baker 
 Jinx Falkenburg as Gloria 
 Ann Savage as Maria 
 Leslie Brooks as Lena Worth 
 Ramsay Ames as Louise Hotchkiss 
 Bob Haymes as Jeff Kenyon 
 Emory Parnell as Rupert Shannon 
 Douglas Leavitt as Sam Grohman 
 Muni Seroff as Gilberto Garcia 
 Max Willenz as Armando Silva 
 Stanley Brown as Mike 
 Frank Sully as Bruiser 
 Charles C. Wilson as Chester T. Allgood 
 Romaine Callender as Miffins

References

Bibliography
 Michael L. Stephens. Art Directors in Cinema: A Worldwide Biographical Dictionary. McFarland, 1998.

External links
 

1943 films
1943 musical comedy films
American musical comedy films
Films directed by Frank Woodruff
Columbia Pictures films
American black-and-white films
1940s English-language films
1940s American films